The name Cosme has been used for seven tropical cyclones in the Eastern Pacific Ocean.
 Tropical Storm Cosme (1983), did not affect land.
 Hurricane Cosme (1989), a large Category 1 hurricane that made landfall near Acapulco; brought heavy rains, which killed at least 30 people due to drowning.
 Hurricane Cosme (1995), a Category 1 hurricane that never affected land, caused no damage or fatalities.
 Tropical Storm Cosme (2001), did not make landfall; dissipated about 820 mi (1,320 km) west-southwest of Cabo San Lucas, Mexico.
 Hurricane Cosme (2007), a Category 1 hurricane that stayed far from land, effects were mostly minor.
 Hurricane Cosme (2013), a Category 1 hurricane; did not make landfall but caused minor damage to the west coast of Mexico and the Revillagigedo Islands.
 Tropical Storm Cosme (2019), never threatened land.

The name Cosme has been used for two tropical cyclones in the Western Pacific.
 Typhoon Sudal (2004) (T0401, 03W, Cosme), strongest typhoon to strike the island of Yap in the Federated States of Micronesia in about 50 years.
 Tropical Storm Halong (2008) (T0804, 05W, Cosme), caused 58 deaths and $94 million (USD) in damage in Luzon, leading to its retirement and being replaced by Carina for future seasons.

Pacific hurricane set index articles
Pacific typhoon set index articles